Cryptostipula is a genus of liverworts belonging to the family Jungermanniaceae.

Species:
 Cryptostipula inundata R.M.Schust.

References

Jungermanniales
Jungermanniales genera